High Moon Studios, Inc. (formerly Sammy Entertainment Inc. and Sammy Studios, Inc.) is an American video game developer initially formed in 2001. After nearly a year as an independent studio, the developer was acquired by Vivendi Games in January 2006 and placed under Sierra Entertainment. It is now owned by Activision Blizzard, Vivendi Games' successor and parent company of Activision. It has developed multiple Transformers video games and assisted in the development of select Call of Duty games, as well as Destiny.

History
High Moon Studios was formed in April 2001 as a division of the Japanese publisher Sammy, first known as Sammy Entertainment and later renamed Sammy Studios the following year, to develop and publish games in America. After Sammy merged with Sega to form Sega Sammy Holdings on October 1, 2004, Sammy discontinued all video game development in America to focus on its Japanese productions, and planned on closing Sammy Studios as part of this. However on March 3, 2005, Sammy Studios was acquired in a management buyout by a group led by president and CEO John Rowe, and renamed High Moon Studios. Turning to game development only, the studio continued development of games from its time as Sammy Studios, including the Western horror shooter Darkwatch. In January 2006, it was announced that Vivendi Universal Games had acquired the studio. After the merger of Vivendi and Activision, High Moon became a subsidiary of Activision Blizzard. 

Following the completion of Deadpool, Activision laid off 40 full-time employees from High Moon Studios that worked on the project. Activision stated "Activision Publishing consistently works to align its costs with its revenues – this is an ongoing process, with the completion of development on Deadpool, we are taking a reduction in staff at High Moon Studios to better align our development talent against our slate."

Games developed

References

External links

High Moon Studios profile on MobyGames

Activision
Companies based in San Diego
American companies established in 2001
Video game companies established in 2001
Sierra Entertainment
2001 establishments in California
Video game companies of the United States
Video game development companies
2006 mergers and acquisitions